The blackbuck (Antilope cervicapra), also known as the Indian antelope, is an antelope native to India and Nepal. It inhabits grassy plains and lightly forested areas with perennial water sources.
The white fur on the chin and around the eyes is in sharp contrast with the black stripes on the face. Both sexes’ coats feature a two-tone colouration; in males, the majority of the body is dark brown to black, with white circles around the eyes, white ears and tail, and the belly, lower jaw, and inner legs also white. Females and juveniles are yellowish-fawn to tan and display the same white areas, only with more of a beige tone than the males. Females also feature a more pronounced horizontal white side-stripe, starting around the shoulder and ending at the rump. The blackbuck is the sole living member of the genus Antilope and was scientifically described by Carl Linnaeus in 1758. Two subspecies are recognized.

The blackbuck is active mainly during the day. It forms three types of small groups: female, male, and young bachelor herds. Males often adopt lekking as a strategy to garner females for mating. While other males are not allowed into these territories, females often visit these places to forage. The male can thus attempt mating with her. The blackbuck is an herbivore and grazes on low grasses, occasionally browsing as well. Females become sexually mature at the age of eight months, but mate no earlier than two years of age. Males mature later, at 1.5 years. Mating takes place throughout the year. Gestation is typically six months long, after which a single calf is born. The lifespan is typically 10 to 15 years.

The antelope is native to and found mainly in India, while it is locally extinct in Pakistan, Afghanistan and Bangladesh. Formerly widespread, only small and scattered herds are seen today, largely confined to protected areas. During the 20th century, blackbuck numbers declined sharply due to excessive hunting, deforestation, and habitat degradation. The blackbuck has been introduced in Argentina and the United States, primarily on hunting ranches. In Argentina, the population is surviving surprisingly well. In India, hunting of blackbuck is prohibited under Schedule I of the Wildlife Protection Act of 1972. The blackbuck has significance in Hinduism; Indian and Nepali villagers do not harm the antelope.

Etymology
The scientific name of the blackbuck is Antilope cervicapra. Its generic name stems from the Latin word antalopus ("horned animal"). The specific name cervicapra is composed of the Latin words cervus ("deer") and capra ("she-goat"). The vernacular name "blackbuck" is a reference to the dark brown to black colour of the dorsal (upper) part of the coat of the males. The earliest recorded use of this name dates back to 1850. Alternative names for the blackbuck are "Indian antelope", kadiyal, kala hiran, krishna mriga in Kannada, krishnasaar in Hindi; kalvit in Marathi; krishna jinka in Telugu); and iralai maan in Tamil.

Taxonomy and evolution
The blackbuck is the sole living member of the genus Antilope and is classified in the family Bovidae. The species was described and given its binomial name by Swedish zoologist Carl Linnaeus in the 10th edition of Systema Naturae in 1758. Antilope also includes fossil species, such as Antilope subtorta and Antilope intermedia.

Antilope, Eudorcas, Gazella, and Nanger form a clade within their tribe Antilopini. A 1995 study of the detailed karyotype of Antilope suggested that within this clade, Antilope is closest to the Gazella group. A 1999 phylogenetic analysis confirmed that Antilope is the closest sister taxon to Gazella, although an earlier phylogeny, proposed in 1976, placed Antilope as sister to Nanger. In a more recent revision of the phylogeny of the Antilopini on the basis of sequences from multiple nuclear and mitochondrial loci in 2013, Eva Verena Bärmann (of the University of Cambridge) and colleagues re-examined the phylogenetic relationships and found Antilope and Gazella to be sister genera distinct from the sister genera Nanger and Eudorcas.

Two subspecies are recognised, although they might be independent species:
 A. c. cervicapra (Linnaeus, 1758), known as the southeastern blackbuck, occurs in southern, eastern, and central India. The white eye ring of the male is narrow above the eye and the neck is all black in the male and the white on the underside is largely restricted to the belly in both males and females. The black leg stripe is well defined and reaches all along the leg.
 A. c. rajputanae Zukowsky, 1927, known as the northwestern blackbuck, occurs in northwestern India. Males have a grey sheen to the dark parts during the breeding season. The white on the underside extends up to half way on the sides of the body and the lower base of the neck of males is white. The white eye ring is broad all around the eye with the leg-stripe going only down to the shanks.

Genetics
The blackbuck shows variation in its diploid chromosome number. Males have 31-33, while females have 30-32. Males have an XY1Y2 sex chromosome. Unusually large sex chromosomes had earlier been described only in a few species, all of which belonged to Rodentia. However, in 1968, a study found that two artiodactyls, the blackbuck and the sitatunga, too, showed this abnormality.  Generally, the X chromosome constitutes 5% of the haploid chromosomal complement, but the X chromosome of the blackbuck this percentage is 14.96. Portions of both peculiarly large chromosomes show delayed replication.

A 1997 study found lower variation in blood protein polymorphism in Antilope in comparison with Antidorcas, Eudorcas, and Gazella. This was attributed to a history of rapid evolution of an autapomorphic phenotype of Antilope. This might have been aided by a particularly strong selection of a few dominant males due to their lekking behaviour.

Characteristics

The blackbuck is a moderately sized antelope. Sexual dimorphism is prominent, as males are heavier and darker than the females. The long, ringed horns, that resemble corkscrews, are generally present only on males, though females may develop horns, as well. They measure , though the maximum horn length recorded in Texas has not exceeded . The horns diverge forming a "V"-like shape. In India, horns are longer and more divergent in specimens from the northern and western parts of the country.

The white fur on the chin and around the eyes is in sharp contrast with the black stripes on the face. The coats of males show two-tone colouration; while the upper parts and outsides of the legs are dark brown to black, the underparts and the insides of the legs are all white. Darkness typically increases as the male ages. On the other hand, females and juveniles are yellowish fawn to tan. In Texas, blackbuck moult in spring, following which the males look notably lighter, though darkness persists on the face and the legs. On the contrary, males grow darker as the breeding season approaches. Both melanism and albinism have been observed in wild blackbuck. Albino blackbuck are often zoo attractions as in the Indira Gandhi Zoological Park (Andhra Pradesh, India).

Blackbuck bear a close resemblance to gazelles, and are distinguished mainly by the fact that while gazelles are brown in the dorsal parts, blackbuck develop a dark brown or black colour in these parts.

Distribution and habitat 

The blackbuck is native to the Indian subcontinent, but locally extinct in Pakistan and Bangladesh.
In Nepal, the last surviving blackbuck population inhabits the Blackbuck Conservation Area south of Bardia National Park. In 2008, the population was estimated to comprise 184 individuals.
In Pakistan, blackbuck occasionally occur along the border with India.
A few blackbucks are present in the Indian Institute of Technology Madras campus.

The blackbuck inhabits grassy plains and thinly forested areas where perennial water sources are available for its daily need to drink. Herds travel long distances to obtain water.

The British naturalist William Thomas Blanford described the range of the blackbuck in his 1891 The Fauna of British India, including Ceylon and Burma as:

Today, only small, scattered herds are seen that are largely confined to protected areas.

The antelope was introduced in Texas in the Edwards Plateau in 1932. By 1988, the population had increased and the antelope was the most populous exotic animal in Texas after the chital. As of early 2000s, the population in the United States was estimated at 35,000. The blackbuck was introduced into Argentina, numbering about 8,600 individuals as of the early 2000s.

Ecology and behaviour 

The blackbuck is a diurnal antelope, though is less active at noon when summer temperatures rise.

Group size fluctuates and seems to depend on the availability of forage and the nature of the habitat. Large herds have an edge over smaller ones in that danger can be detected faster, though individual vigilance is lower in the former. Large herds spend more time feeding than small herds. A disadvantage for large herds, however, is that traveling requires more resources. Herd size reduces in summer.

Males often adopt lekking as a strategy on the part of males to garner females for mating. Territories are established by males on the basis of the local distribution of female groups, which in turn is determined by the habitat, so as to ensure greater access to females. While other males are not allowed into these territories, females are allowed to visit these places to forage. The male can attempt mating with visiting females. Lekking is a demanding strategy, as the males often have to bear injuries – thus it is a tactic typically adopted by strong, dominant males. Males may either defend their mates or try to forcibly copulate with them. Weaker males, who may not be dominant, might choose the second method.

The blackbuck is severely affected by natural calamities such as floods and droughts, from which it can take as long as five years to recover. The wolf is a major predator. Old rutting bulls might be especially vulnerable prey. The golden jackal hunts juveniles. Village dogs are reported to kill fawns, but are unlikely to successfully hunt and kill adults.

Blackbucks in Great Indian Bustard Sanctuary show flexible habitat use as the resources and risks change seasonally in the landscape. Human activities strongly influenced the movement of herds, but the presence of small refuges allowed them to persist in the landscape.

Diet

The blackbuck is a herbivore and grazes on low grasses, occasionally browsing as well. It prefers sedges, fall witchgrass, mesquite, and live oak and was occasionally observed browsing on acacia trees in the Cholistan Desert. Oats and berseem were found to be palatable and nutritious to captive populations. In Velavadar Black Buck Sanctuary, Dichanthium annulatum comprised 35% of the diet. Digestion of nutrients, especially crude proteins, was poor in summer, but more efficient in the rainy and winter seasons. Crude protein intake in summer was very low, even below the recommended value. Blackbuck consumed less food in summer than in winter, and often foraged on the fruits of Prosopis juliflora. Prosopis becomes a significant food item if grasses are scarce. Water is a daily requirement of the blackbuck.

Reproduction

Females become sexually mature at the age of eight months, but mate no earlier than two years. Males mature at the age of one-and-a-half years. Mating takes place throughout the year; peaks occur during spring and fall in Texas. Two peaks have been observed in India: from August to October and from March to April. Rutting males aggressively establish and defend their territories from other males, giving out loud grunts and engaging in serious head-to-head fights, pushing each other using horns. Aggressive display consists of thrusting the neck forward and raising it, folding the ears and raising the tail. The dominant male pursues the female with his nose pointing upward, smells her urine and shows a flehmen response. The female shows her receptivity by waving her tail and thumping the hindlegs on the ground. This is followed by several mounting attempts, and copulation. The whole process may last as long as six hours. The female will remain still for some time after copulation, following which she may start grazing. The male may then move on to mate with another female.

Gestation typically lasts six months, after which a single calf is born. Newborns are a light yellow; infant males may have a black patch on the head and the neck. Young are precocial, they can stand on their own soon after birth. Females can mate again after a month of parturition. Juveniles remain active and playful throughout the day. Juvenile males turn black gradually, darkening notably after the third year. The lifespan is typically 10 to 15 years.

Threats

During the 20th century, blackbuck numbers declined sharply due to excessive hunting, deforestation and habitat degradation. Some blackbucks are killed illegally especially where the species is sympatric with nilgai.

Until India's independence in 1947, blackbuck and chinkara were hunted in many princely states with specially trained captive Asiatic cheetahs. By the 1970s, blackbuck was locally extinct in several areas.

Conservation
The blackbuck is listed under Appendix III of CITES.
In India, hunting of blackbuck is prohibited under Schedule I of the Wildlife Protection Act of 1972. It inhabits several protected areas of India, including
 in Gujarat: Velavadar National Park, Gir Forest National Park;
in Bihar: Kaimur Wildlife Sanctuary;
in Maharashtra: Great Indian Bustard Sanctuary;
in Madhya Pradesh: Kanha National Park
in Rajasthan: Tal Chhapar Sanctuary, National Chambal Sanctuary, Ranthambhore National Park
in Karnataka: Ranibennur Blackbuck Sanctuary;
in Tamil Nadu: Point Calimere Wildlife and Bird Sanctuary, Vallanadu Wildlife Sanctuary, Guindy National Park.
A captive population is maintained in Pakistan's Lal Suhanra National Park.

In culture

The blackbuck has associations with the Indian culture. The antelope might have been a source of food in the Indus Valley civilisation (3300–1700 BCE); bone remains have been discovered in sites such as Dholavira and Mehrgarh. The blackbuck is routinely depicted in miniature paintings of the Mughal era (16th to 19th centuries) depicting royal hunts often using cheetahs. Villagers in India and Nepal generally do not harm the blackbuck. Tribes such as the Bishnois revere and care for most animals including the blackbuck.

The animal is mentioned in Sanskrit texts as the krishna mrig. According to Hindu mythology, the blackbuck draws the chariot of Lord Krishna. The blackbuck is considered to be the vehicle of Vayu (the wind god), Soma (the divine drink) and Chandra (the moon god). In Tamil Nadu, the blackbuck is considered to be the vehicle of the Hindu goddess Korravai. In Rajasthan, the goddess Karni Mata is believed to protect the blackbuck.

In the Yājñavalkya Smṛti, Sage Yagyavalkya is quoted stating "in what country there is black antelope, in that Dharma must be known", which is interpreted to mean that certain religious practices including sacrifices were not to be performed where blackbuck did not roam.

The hide of the blackbuck (krishnajina in Hindi) is deemed to be sacred in Hinduism. According to the scriptures, it is to be sat upon only by brahmins (priests), sadhus and yogis (sages), forest-dwellers and bhikshus (mendicants). Blackbuck meat is highly regarded in Texas. In an analysis, blackbuck milk was found to have 6.9% protein, 9.3% fat, and 4.3% lactose.

In some agricultural areas in northern India, the blackbuck are found in large numbers and raid crop fields. However, the damage caused by blackbuck is far lower than that caused by the nilgai.

In 2018, Bollywood actor Salman Khan, in a high-profile case, was sentenced to five years imprisonment for poaching a blackbuck in 1998.

Gallery

See also
Barasingha
Chital
Sambar deer

References

External links

BBC Nature: Blackbuck

Antilopini
Antelopes of Asia
Mammals of India
Mammals of Nepal
Mammals of Pakistan
Fauna of Rajasthan
Fauna of South Asia
Fauna of the Thar Desert
Mammals described in 1758
Taxa named by Carl Linnaeus
Symbols of Haryana